Idle Thoughts of an Idle Fellow, published in 1886, is a collection of humorous essays  by Jerome K. Jerome. It was the author’s second published book and it helped establish him as a leading English humorist. While widely considered one of Jerome’s better works, and in spite of using the same style as Three Men in a Boat, it was never as popular as the latter. A second "Idle Thoughts" book, The Second Thoughts of An Idle Fellow, was published in 1898.

The essays had previously appeared in Home Chimes, the same magazine that later serialised Jerome's Three Men in a Boat.

Content
The book consists of 14 independent articles arranged by themes:

 ON BEING IDLE.
 ON BEING IN LOVE.
 ON BEING IN THE BLUES.
 ON BEING HARD UP.
 ON VANITY AND VANITIES.
 ON GETTING ON IN THE WORLD.
 ON THE WEATHER.
 ON CATS AND DOGS.
 ON BEING SHY.
 ON BABIES.
 ON EATING AND DRINKING.
 ON FURNISHED APARTMENTS.
 ON DRESS AND DEPORTMENT.
 ON MEMORY.

Book excerpts

Influence on other literary works
Lazy Thoughts of a Lazy Girl, a book by the pseudonymous "Jenny Wren", was published in 1891. The actual author is still anonymous. The book has the same form as Idle Thoughts of an Idle Fellow, but is from the point of view of a woman.

The foundation of bi-yearly British magazine The Idler was influenced by the title and the ideas expressed in Idle Thoughts of an Idle Fellow.

Trivia

 Jerome dedicated the book to his friend and companion in idleness: his pipe.

References

External links

 Project Gutenberg: Idle Thoughts of an Idle Fellow
 

1886 non-fiction books
Comedy books
Works by Jerome K. Jerome